Sangabuye is an administrative ward in Ilemela District, Mwanza Region, Tanzania with a postcode number 33209. , the ward had a total population of 8,935 according to the national Census of 2002 this was before split from Nyamagana District on 1 October 2012 as Ilemela becomes a District Council where given total of 20 wards, and for the whole District had 265911 comparing with the National Census of 2012

References

Wards of Mwanza Region
Ilemela District
Constituencies of Tanzania